The Mogalakwena Solar Power Station is a planned  solar power plant in South Africa. The solar farm is under development by a consortium comprising Pele Green Energy, a South African independent power producer (IPP) and EDF Renewables, a subsidiary of the French energy multinational Électricité de France (EDF). The energy generated here will be used to supply the Mogalakwena platinum mine of Anglo American Platinum, in Limpopo Province.

Location
The power station will be located in the town of Mokopane, in Mogalakwena Municipality, in Waterberg District, in the Limpopo Province of South Africa. The solar farm will sit on the campus of "Mogalakwena platinum mining complex", owned by Anglo American Platinum, the largest producer of platinum in the world.

Overview
Anglo American Platinum is in the process of reducing its global carbon footprint. As part of those efforts, the conglomerate, has plans to reach carbon neutrality by 2040. This renewable energy infrastructure project is one of the developments towards that goal. Construction is expected to start in the fourth quarter of 2022 and conclude in the fourth quarter of 2023.

Other ongoing efforts by the mining group include the production of "green hydrogen" at Mogalakwena. The hydrogen will then be used to power the rail system and possibly transport trucks and buses within the mine.

Developers
Anglo American Platinum has selected the companies illustrated in the table below, to design and construct the power station. The developers are expected to form a special purpose vehicle company to carry out the task. For descriptive purposes we will call that company Mogalakwena Solar Power Consortium.

Other considerations
When the ownership documents are finalized, Anglo American Platinum has arranged, for a 10 percent shareholding to be assigned to a community trust (which does not have to contribute any capital), whereby any profits assigned to the trust will benefit the communities where Anglo American Platinum maintains operations.

See also

List of power stations in South Africa
Exxaro Solar Power Station

References

External links
 Approximate Location of Mogalakwena Solar Power Station

Solar power stations in South Africa
Waterberg District Municipality
Proposed solar power stations
Economy of Limpopo